Leduc County is a municipal district in Alberta, Canada that is immediately south of the City of Edmonton. The municipal district is home to prairie parkland and several lakes and is home to the Edmonton International Airport, the Nisku Industrial Business Park and the Genesee Generating Station.

Geography

Communities and localities 
The following urban municipalities are surrounded by Leduc County.
Cities
Beaumont
Leduc
Towns
Calmar
Devon
Thorsby
Villages
Warburg
Summer villages
Golden Days
Itaska Beach
Sundance Beach

The following hamlets are located within Leduc County.
Hamlets
Buford
Kavanagh
Looma
New Sarepta
Nisku
Rolly View
Sunnybrook
Telfordville

The following localities are located within Leduc County.
Localities 

Alsike
Amarillo Park
Anchor Farms
Beau Vista North
Beau Vista South
Brenda Vista
Caywood Estates
Clover Lawn
Cloverlawn Estates
Conjuring Creek
Creekland
Edda Vista

Fern Creek
Fisher Home
Gateway Estates
Genesee
Glen Park
Goudreau
Green Acres
Hazel Grove
Hilltop Estates
Huggett
Ireton
Kayda Vista

Keystone
Linda Vista
Looma Estates
Marquis Development
Michigan Centre
Mini Vista
Panorama Acres
Paterson Park
Pemburton Hill
Richdale Estates
Sandholm Beach

Scottsdale Estates
South Looking Lake
Southwood Park
St. Francis
Strawberry Hill Estates
Sunnyville
Tiebecke Estates
Treasure Island Estates
Valley View Acres
Weed Creek
Woodvale Park

Other places
East Vistas (new urban community approved September 28, 2010)

Demographics 

In the 2016 Census of Population conducted by Statistics Canada, Leduc County had a population of 13,780 living in 5,101 of its 5,960 total private dwellings, a  change from its 2011 population of 13,494.

See also 
List of communities in Alberta
List of municipal districts in Alberta

References

External links 

 
Edmonton Metropolitan Region
Municipal districts in Alberta